Naqiabad (also Romanized as Naqīābād; also known as Taqīābād) is a village in Rezqabad Rural District, in the Central District of Esfarayen County, North Khorasan Province, Iran. At the 2006 census, its population was 285, in 67 families.

References 

Populated places in Esfarayen County